Aliheydar Aligulu oglu Ibragimov (24 December 1906 – 6 November 1953) was a Soviet military officer, a participant in the Great Patriotic War, and a participant in the liberation struggle of Brest Fortress. He was the Commander of the 4th Guards corps anti-tank fighter division and a Guards Major of the Red Army.

Biography

Early life and battles 
He was born in 1906 in Bilgəh. He served in the Red Army from 1923 to 1935, and again after 1941. With his first war in the army, he fought in the South-Western Front. In 1941 in the battle of Poltava, he became wounded. He was a member of the battle for the Caucasuses, and fought in the North Caucasus Front and the Northern Group.

Development 
In 1944, he fought in the 4th Ukrainian Front and helped liberate Odessa. He distinguished himself during the fighting from 6 to 18 March 1944. As deputy commander of the 4th Fighter separate antitank battalion drill parts, he served with Guard Captain Aliheydar Ibragimov and was at the forefront of the division. On 10 March 1944, in the area of Bashtanka, he personally led a reflection of two enemy attacks, during which the Germans lost over 60 men. On 14 March in Kuban, he led five tanks to burst into the column of the enemy force to infantry regiment of artillery and self-propelled guns, defeating and scattering the enemy column. On the battlefield, this effort left 170 dead soldiers and officers. For his leadership personnel and courage in battle, Ibragimov was awarded the Order of Alexander Nevsky on the suggestion of commander of the 4th Guards Cossack Cavalry Corps Guard Lieutenant-General Pliev.

Death 
The summer of 1944, when he was already commander of artillery battalion participated in the liberation of Brest and the Brest Fortress. In the battle for Brest, the Major Ibragimov was seriously wounded. He received a total of 17 injuries and lost his sight. Died of his wounds 6 November 1953. He was awarded two Orders of Alexander Nevsky, the Order of the Red Banner, Order of the Red Star and Order of the Badge of Honour, medals "For Military Merit" and "For the defense of the Caucasus".

Soviet military personnel of World War II from Azerbaijan
1906 births
1953 deaths
Soviet Army officers